To mistreat is to abuse.

Mistreat and similar may also refer to:

"Mistreated" (song), a song by Deep Purple from their 1974 album Burn
"Mistreater", a song by Grace Slick from her 1981 album Welcome to the Wrecking Ball!
"Mistreated", a song by Robert Chapman from his 1996 album Kiss My Soul
Mistreatment (film), a 1969 Swedish film